The Bartolina Sisa National Confederation of Campesino, Indigenous, and Native Women of Bolivia (CNMCIOB-BS; informally, the Bartolina Sisas) is the primary union organization of peasant women in Bolivia, and the women's organization with the largest membership in the country. The organization was founded as the Bartolina Sisa National Federation of Peasant Women of Bolivia in January 1980, shortly after the founding of the Unified Syndical Confederation of Rural Workers of Bolivia (CSUTCB).  The founding members were Lucila Mejía de Morales (the first executive), Irma García, Isabel Juaniquina and Isabel Ortega. The name Bartolina Sisa refers to the Aymara peasant leader of the 18th century, the wife of Túpac Katari, and reflects the strong influence of the Katarista movement in peasant politics.  The current name was adopted in the organization's Organic Congress of 29-30 November 2008, redefining the organization as a confederation and adopting the phrase Campesino, Indigenous, and Native from the text of the new Bolivian constitution. Their main aims are to organize and facilitate women's participation in national terrain. The Bartolina Sisa Confederation is a member of the Pact of Unity in Bolivia, and of the National Coordination for Change, and a constituent organization in the Movement toward Socialism party.  The  president of the Constituent Assembly in Bolivia, Silvia Lazarte, was elected Executive Secretary at the National level at the 8th national congress in April 1999.

References

Trade unions in Bolivia
Women's organisations based in Bolivia
Trade unions established in 1980